Hexahydroxybenzene trisoxalate is a chemical compound, an oxide of carbon with formula . Its molecule consists of a benzene core with the six hydrogen atoms replaced by three oxalate groups. It can be seen as a sixfold ester of benzenehexol and oxalic acid.

The compound was first described by H. S. Verter and R. Dominic in 1967.

See also
 Tetrahydroxy-1,4-benzoquinone bisoxalate
 Tetrahydroxy-1,4-benzoquinone biscarbonate
 Hexahydroxybenzene triscarbonate

References

 

Oxocarbons
Oxalate esters
Conjugated ketones